The Italian International in badminton is an international open held in Italy since 1994. It was halted between 1996 and 1998, and in 2000. The tournament belongs to the EBU Circuit.

Previous winners

Performances by nation

References

External links
Past Years Winners at www.badmintonitalia.it

Badminton tournaments in Italy